The floating match is a magic trick in which a matchstick appears to float over a playing card.

This effect was originally created by Ben Harris.  Over the years, many copies of the effect have been made. Most of them include a pre-made gimmicked card to be used for the effect. It has been described as one of the most ripped-off effects in magic.

References

magic tricks